The fifth season of CSI: Miami premiered on CBS on September 18, 2006 and ended May 14, 2007. The series stars David Caruso and Emily Procter.

Description 

With Caine and Delko in Brazil, it's up to Duquesne to maintain the department following Natalia's transfer to the MDPD. All of this just in time for them to investigate not only external crimes committed against the general public but also internal issues. As Wolfe accidentally becomes involved in counterfeiting, Duquesne's life is endangered due to her involvement in an investigation surrounding gang warfare. Boa Vista is confronted by her abusive ex-husband again, while Caine and Delko seek to revenge those responsible for the death of Marisol. Tripp comes face to face with death after stepping on a landmine. Ultimately, however, it's Delko, once again, who faces the biggest challenge, as he fights for his life following a gunshot wound to the head.

Cast

Starring 
 David Caruso as Horatio Caine; a CSI Lieutenant and the Director of the MDPD Crime Lab.
 Emily Procter as Calleigh Duquesne; a veteran CSI Detective, the CSI Assistant Supervisor and a ballistics expert.
 Adam Rodriguez as Eric Delko; a CSI Detective and Wolfe's partner.
 Khandi Alexander as Alexx Woods; a Medical Examiner assigned to CSI.
 Jonathan Togo as Ryan Wolfe; a CSI Detective and Delko's partner.
 Rex Linn as Frank Tripp; a senior Robbery-Homicide Division (RHD) Detective assigned to assist the CSI's.
 Eva LaRue as Natalia Boa Vista; a CSI Detective and former FBI Agent.

Recurring 
Sofia Milos as Yelina Salas; a Private Investigator.
Rob Estes as Nick Townsend; Natalia's ex-husband.
Johnny Whitworth as Jake Berkeley; an undercover MDPD Narcotics Detective.
David Lee Smith as Rick Stetler; an IAB officer.

Episodes

References

External links
 DVD Release Dates at TVShowsOnDVD.com.

05
2006 American television seasons
2007 American television seasons